Theodore Roosevelt I may refer to:
 Theodore Roosevelt Sr. (1831–1878), American businessman and philanthropist
 Theodore Roosevelt (1858–1919), 26th president of the United States